Guillaume Lebrun is a French head chef in the Michelin starred Restaurant Patrick Guilbaud in Dublin, Ireland.

He was born in rural France, as son of a baker. He wanted to do something with food later in life but taking over the bakery was impossible, due to an allergy to flour so he started training to become chef. He learned and worked his way up to a two-star restaurant in Paris. Then he got his lucky break and came in contact with Patrick Guilbaud, who at that time was looking for a chef for his new restaurant in Ireland.

In 1981 Lebrun arrived in Dublin to work in Restaurant Patrick Guilbaud. There he had a difficult start, but Guilbaud prevented him from leaving.

Lebrun's signature dishes include Lobster Ravioli, Roast Challans Duck for two and Assiette Gourmande au Chocolat.

Personal
 Lebrun is not a celebrity chef like many other Michelin starred chefs. He believes that chefs should be invisible.
 His hobbies are pigeon shooting, fishing and paintings.
 Lebrun is married to an Irish woman and has three bilingual children. Andree Lebrun, Denno Lebrun, Kiks Lebrun

Awards
 One Michelin star: 1989-1995
 Two Michelin stars: 1996–present

References

Irish chefs
Living people
Head chefs of Michelin starred restaurants
Year of birth missing (living people)